The horn ( or ) is a diacritic mark attached to the top right corner of the letters o and u in the Vietnamese alphabet to give ơ and ư, unrounded variants of the vowel represented by the basic letter. In Vietnamese, they are rarely considered as diacritics; but rather, the characters ơ and ư are considered as different letters from o and u.

Letters with horn

Encodings
In Unicode, horn is encoded as a combining mark, and precomposed letters.

 

Precombined characters in Unicode and HTML codes:
 
 
and

See also
Hook (diacritic)
Acute accent
Apostrophe

Latin-script diacritics
Vietnamese language